DaRon Bland (born July 12, 1999) is an American football cornerback for the Dallas Cowboys of the National Football League (NFL). He played college football at Sacramento State before 
transferring to Fresno State.

Early life and high school
Bland grew up in Modesto, California and attended Central Catholic High School. He was named the Valley Oak League Defensive Player of the Year as a senior.

College career
Bland began his college career at Sacramento State. As a junior, he was named first-team All-Big Sky Conference after recording 43 tackles, 6.5 tackles for loss, one sack, and forced fumbles with two interceptions and eight passes broken up. After his senior season was canceled and moved to the spring of 2021 due to the COVID-19 pandemic in the United States, Bland entered the NCAA Transfer Portal. 

Bland ultimately committed to transfer to Fresno State. In his only season with the Bulldogs he recorded 45 tackles with five passes defended and two interceptions in 13 games played.

Professional career

Bland was selected in the fifth round of the 2022 NFL Draft by the Dallas Cowboys. 

Bland recorded his first career interception on October 2, 2022 versus Carson Wentz.  Bland would then have two picks against Matt Ryan on December 4, 2022.

References

External links
 Dallas Cowboys bio
Sacramento State Hornets bio
Fresno State Bulldogs bio

1999 births
Living people
American football cornerbacks
Sacramento State Hornets football players
Fresno State Bulldogs football players
Dallas Cowboys players